This is a list of the  operational coal-fired power stations in the United States.

Coal generated 23% of electricity in the United States in 2021, an amount similar to that from renewable energy or nuclear power, but about half of that generated by natural gas plants. Coal was 19% of generating capacity.

Between 2010 and May 2019, 290 coal power plants, or 40% of the U.S. coal generating capacity, closed. This was mainly due to competition from other generating sources, primarily cheaper and cleaner natural gas, as a result of the fracking boom, which has replaced so many coal plants that natural gas in 2019 accounted for 40% of the total electricity generation in the U.S., as well as the decrease in the cost of renewables. However, some coal plants remain profitable because costs to other people due to the health and environmental impact of the coal industry (estimated to average 5 cents per kWh) is not priced into the cost of generation. Some coal plants are considering only operating during periods of higher electricity demand, from December to February and from June to August.

Coal-fired power stations

See also 
 List of decommissioned coal-fired power stations in the United States
 List of power stations in the United States
 List of largest power stations in the United States
 List of natural gas-fired power stations in the United States

Notes

References

External links 

 
 Mapped: The world’s coal power plants in 2020

Coal
Lists of coal-fired power stations